Right Between the Eyes may refer to:
 Right Between the Eyes (album), a 1989 album by Icon, or the title song
 "Right Between the Eyes" (Wax song), 1986
 "Right Between the Eyes" (Tom Dice song), 2016